Freziera sessiliflora is a species of plant in the Pentaphylacaceae family. It is endemic to Colombia.

References

sessiliflora
Vulnerable plants
Endemic flora of Colombia
Taxonomy articles created by Polbot